Abbie Gardner may refer to:
Abbie Gardner (musician), member of the band Red Molly
Abbie Gardner-Sharp, survivor of the Spirit Lake Massacre